Reconstructor is a commercial point cloud processing software. Developed and marketed by the Italian software house Gexcel, Reconstructor was first released in September 2007 and continuously updated since then. It's a complete point cloud processing software package that includes many post processing tools for 3D reconstruction, post processing, measurements, 3D modeling and content creation.

The Geomax, Stonex and Teledyne-Opetch manufacturers have chosen Reconstructor technology for their customers.

History 
The technology behind Reconstructor has been initially born through a technology transfer agreement between the Joint Research Centre and Gexcel in 2007, to introduce the lidar technology for international nuclear plants monitoring into the market. Nowadays the software is completely built in-house by Gexcel.
Initially called JRC3DReconstructor, it is constantly growing to adapt the structure, functionalities and tools to the surveyors' needs. From 2019 release become Reconstructor and introduced a new add-on structure.

The core software available with a perpetual licence of monthly temporary licence allows to register, analyze, inspect, measure and share data. Then you can add a set of commands to detect specific industries like Land and Quarry (Mining add-on), Cultural Heritage (Color add-on), Mobile mapping dataset (HERON add-on). The technology behind Reconstructor is also academically traceable, as it can be available with a special educational licence.

See also 
 3D reconstruction
 Joint Research Centre

External links 
 Gexcel official site
 Reconstructor software features list

References 

Multimedia software